Events in the year 1906 in Norway.

Incumbents
Monarch – Haakon VII
Prime Minister of Norway – Christian Michelsen

Events
 12 January - Mining starts at A/S Sydvaranger in Finnmark.
 4–5 February - Noregs Mållag is founded in Kristiania.
 1 March - The steamship "Thor" sinks near Lyngholmen in Sveio, 39 people perish.
 2 March - The Second Gjæsling Accident: 25 fishermen is killed in a storm in the fjord Folda, Trøndelag.
 2 March - The first Norwegian Blue Cross association is founded in Kristiania.
 8 March - 19 people perish in an avalanche close to the fishing village Steine in Lofoten.
 22 June – Haakon VII and Maud of Wales are crowned monarch and consort of Norway in the Nidaros Cathedral.
 27 June - Coop Norge is established.
 4 September - The Norwegian explorer Roald Amundsen completed a three-year voyage through the Northwest Passage in the converted herring boat Gjøa, after being trapped in ice for three winters.
 The 1906 Parliamentary election takes place.

Popular culture

Sports

28 August – Moss FK football club is founded.

Music

Film

Literature
 The Knut Hamsund novel Under Høststjærnen. En Vandrers Fortælling (Under the Autumn Star), was published.

Notable births
9 January – Leif Larsen, naval officer (died 1990)
30 January – Greta Nissan, actress (died 1988)
31 January – Jørgen Adolf Lier, politician (died 1994)
17 February – Henrik Selberg, mathematician (died 1993).
1 April – Sigve Lie, sailor and twice Olympic gold medallist (died 1958)
6 April – Bernt Østerkløft, Nordic combined skier (died 1996)
20 April – Johan Jentoft Johansen, politician (died 1973)
29 April – Arthur Arntzen, politician (died 1997)
15 May – Alf Andersen, ski jumper and Olympic gold medallist (died 1975)
26 May – Fridtjov Søiland Birkeli, Lutheran missionary, writer, magazine editor, and bishop (died 1983).
29 May – Andreas Holm, politician (died 2003)
5 June – Andreas Holmsen, professor and historian (died 1989)
11 June – Sigurd Marius Johansen, politician (died 1989)
18 June – Nils Handal, politician and Minister (died 1992)
23 June – Holger Albrechtsen, hurdler (died 1992)
13 July – Erling Petersen, economist and politician (died 1992)
19 July – Klaus Egge, composer and music critic (died 1979)
9 August – Atle Roll-Matthiesen, judge.
11 August – Haakon Lind, boxer (died 1955)
15 August – Asle Enger, priest (died 2000).
15 August – Gunvor Katharina Eker, politician (died 1980)
16 August – Harald Damsleth, cartoonist, illustrator and ad-man (died 1971)
24 August – Otto Berg, long jumper (died 1991)
21 September – Lauritz Johnson, novelist, children's writer, and radio and television host (died 1992).
9 October – Rolf Hansen, long distance runner (died 1980)
9 October – Haakon Pedersen, speed skater (died 1991)
11 October – Olaf Hansen, boxer (died 1986)
17 October – Brynjulf Bull, lawyer, Supreme Court advocate and politician (died 1993)
13 November – Torborg Nedreaas, author (died 1987)
22 November – Jørgen Juve, international soccer player and Olympic bronze medallist (died 1983)
1 December – Jakob Sande, writer, poet and folk singer (died 1967)
8 December – Borghild Bondevik Haga, politician (died 1990)

Full date unknown
Caroline Mikkelsen, first woman to set foot on Antarctica
Arne Skaug, politician and Minister (died 1974)
Egil Lindberg, radio officer and intelligence agent (died 1952).

Notable deaths

21 February – Walter Scott Dahl, politician and Minister (born 1839)
8 March – Johannes Bergh, barrister (born 1837).
6 April – Alexander Kielland, novelist (born 1849)
14 April – Ole Irgens, politician (born 1829)
15 April – Anders Bull, politician and Minister (born 1817)
23 May – Henrik Ibsen, playwright (born 1828)
26 October  – Rolf Andvord, shipowner and consul (born 1847)
5 November – Frits Thaulow, painter (born 1847)

See also

References

External links

1906
Norway